A salumeria is a food producer and retail store that produces salumi and other food products. Some only sell foods, while not producing on-site, and some have a restaurant with sit-down service. The salumeria originated in Italy, and dates to the Middle Ages.

Overview

A salumeria is a food purveyor and retail store that produces and sells salumi, which are meat products of Italian origin that includes sausages, cold cuts and other foods predominantly made from pork. Some salumerias also produce some beef-based products, such as bresaola, a salted beef product, and purvey other food products such as pasta, cheese, preserved foods, anchovies, salt cod, wines, bread and cooked meats. Some modern salumerias only sell salumi and related products, while not producing products on-premises. Some salumerias also operate sit-down restaurants, such as Sorriso Italian Salumeria in  Queens, New York City. Salumeria Biellese is another salumeria in New York City that is well-known, and was established in 1925.

History
The salumeria originated in Italy and dates to the Middle Ages. Historically, salumerias in Bologna, Italy did not produce their own meats. They selected meats and other products such as pasta, olives and cheeses from local purveyors. These purveyors worked in a guild system that was created by the signori in Bologna, the city's rulers, in a system that dates to the Middle Ages. Purveyors for salumeria products included the salaroli, which controlled the salt industry, who salted the pork, which was then shipped to the lardaioli, a guild that sold the pork. The lardaioli also produced soap and candles from the pork lard they would receive. This guild system was eliminated by Napoléon Bonaparte around the time of the turn of the 19th century.

Gallery

See also

 Appetizing store
 Delicatessen
 List of sausages
 Osteria
 Traiteur (culinary profession)
 Trattoria

References

Further reading

External links
 

Food retailers
Italian cuisine